Chinna Marumagal is a 1992 Indian Tamil-language drama film, directed by Prasanthkumar and produced by Keyaar. The film stars Sivaji Ganesan, Siva, Mohini and Delhi Ganesh in lead roles. It is a remake of the Bengali film Choto Bou (1987). The film was released on 23 May 1992.

Plot

Cast 
Sivaji Ganesan
Siva as Siva
Mohini as Geeta
Delhi Ganesh
Thyagu
Vadivukkarasi as Rajeshwari
Renuka as Shanti
Rajesh as Sekhar

Soundtrack 
Soundtrack was composed by debutant Sri Raj, with lyrics by Vaali.

Reception 
The Indian Express wrote, "Prashanth Kumar's direction is average as the narration lacks depth."

References

External links 
 

1990s Tamil-language films
1992 drama films
1992 films
Indian drama films
Tamil remakes of Bengali films